Kenneth Muir may refer to:

 Kenneth Muir (VC) (1912–1950), British recipient of the Victoria Cross
 Kenneth Hart Muir (1916–1942), United States Navy officer
 Kenneth Muir (scholar) (1907–1996), literary scholar and author
 Kenneth Muir (Neighbours), fictional character on the Australian soap opera Neighbours